Giovanni Costigan (1905–1990) was a historian and specialist in Irish and English history.

Costigan was educated at the University of Oxford. He received a Master of Arts at the University of Wisconsin–Madison where he earned his PhD. In 1934 he joined the history department at the University of Washington where he served for 41 years. He was a staunch critic of American involvement in the Vietnam war. One Seattle reporter stated Costigan was a "combative man of peace."

Costigan's works include: Sigmund Freud: A Short Biography(1965), Makers of Modern England (1967), and History of Modern Ireland (1969). He was awarded with Man of the Year in Seattle and received the first Distinguished Teaching Award from the University of Washington.

References

External links
Giovanni Costigan, 85, A Professor of History New York Times obituary

1905 births
1985 deaths
20th-century American historians
20th-century American male writers
University of Washington faculty
University of Wisconsin–Madison alumni
American male non-fiction writers
Alumni of the University of Oxford